Jalal Ahmad is a practicing Bangladeshi architect. He is the Ex-President of Institute of Architects Bangladesh and the vice president of Commonwealth Association of Architects.

Career

Ahmad was born in 1959, Sylhet. He completed his bachelor of architecture from Bangladesh University of Engineering and Technology and established Diagram Architects in 1983 with two other partners. Later he started his own architectural farm J. A. Architects in 1997. He won the North South University Campus International Design Competition (2002) and Mujib Nagar Memorial Open Design Competition (1984). He is a founding member of the architectural research group CHETANA, established in 1983.

Notable works
 Scholastica school at Dhaka and Savar
 Training And Resource Center, BRAC at Faridpur, Rangpur and Bogra
 Dominic Residence, Tanzania

Awards
 IAB Architect of the Year Award (2016) 
ARCASIA Award for Architecture (2018)

References

Bangladeshi architects
Living people
20th-century Bangladeshi architects
21st-century Bangladeshi architects
1959 births
People from Sylhet
Bangladesh University of Engineering and Technology alumni